Li Dawei may refer to:

Li Dawei (writer) (李大卫; born 1963), Chinese writer
Li Dawei (director) (李大为; 1970–2018), Chinese director
David Lee (politician) (born 1949), or Li Dawei, Taiwanese politician